Sayyid Abdullah was an Afghan politician who served as 1st Vice President of Afghanistan and Minister of Finance. He was appointed to Vice President's office and Finance minister office by Mohammed Daoud Khan. He was also assassinated with Mohammed Daoud Khan.

References 

Vice presidents of Afghanistan
Finance Ministers of Afghanistan